Section 2 is the second album by The Howling Hex.  It was released as an LP by Drag City in 2004.

Track listing

Side one
"Where's the Party at, Peaches & Cream? It's Been a While" (Howling Hex)
"Rock-a-Doodle-Doo" (Linda Lewis)
"You Remind Me That I'm Hanging by a Moment" (Howling Hex)

Side two
"Turn Off the Light, Like a Hero Living It Up" (Howling Hex)
"Breakaway" (William Truckaway)

2004 albums
Howling Hex albums
Drag City (record label) albums